This is a list of salaries of heads of state and government per year, showing heads of state and heads of government where different, mainly in parliamentary systems. Often a leader is both in presidential systems. Some states have semi-presidential systems, where the head of government role is fulfilled by both the listed head of government and the head of state.

Member states and observers of the United Nations, Hong Kong, Taiwan, and the European Union
GDP per capita means 2020 nominal GDP per capita in 2021 local currency units provided by the International Monetary Fund.

Other nations
The following states control their territory and are recognized by at least one UN member state.

The following states/governments control their territory, but are not recognized by any UN member states.

Notes

References

 List
Lists of heads of government